Dehak (also Romanized as Dahak) is a village in Bibi Sakineh Rural District, in the Central District of Malard County, Tehran Province, Iran. At the 2006 census, its population was 493, in 112 families.

References 

Populated places in Malard County